Juan Francisco Peña [peh-nya] (born June 27, 1977 in Santo Domingo, Dominican Republic) is a former starting pitcher in Major League Baseball who played briefly for the Boston Red Sox during the  season. Listed at 6' 5", 215 lb., he batted and threw right-handed.

Peña was a promising young pitcher in the Red Sox organization who had his baseball career shortened after suffering a serious injury. He posted a 2-0 record with a 0.69 ERA in two starts, giving up one run on nine hits and three walks while striking out 15 in 13 innings of work.

In spring training before the 2000 season, Peña was projected for the fifth starting rotation spot. He was 2-2 with a 1.64 ERA in 16⅔ innings, but was hit in the elbow by a line drive and then experienced pain in the elbow during a warmup. An exam confirmed a torn medial collateral ligament in his elbow that required surgery, causing him to miss the season. By 2002, Peña had worked his way back to Triple-A, but he went just 4-11 with a 5.33 ERA, after which the Red Sox let him go. He spent the 2003 season in the Toronto Blue Jays organization, then spent two seasons pitching in the independent leagues and the Mexican League before retiring in 2005 at the age of 28. He now resides in South Florida with his girlfriend of nearly 2 years.

See also
List of players from Dominican Republic in Major League Baseball

External links

Retrosheet
2000 Spring training

1975 births
Boston Red Sox players
Dominican Republic expatriate baseball players in the United States
El Paso Diablos players
Living people
Major League Baseball pitchers
Major League Baseball players from the Dominican Republic
Miami Dade Sharks baseball players
Nashua Pride players
Pawtucket Red Sox players
Central American and Caribbean Games gold medalists for the Dominican Republic
Central American and Caribbean Games medalists in baseball
Competitors at the 2010 Central American and Caribbean Games
Azucareros del Este players
Gulf Coast Red Sox players
Michigan Battle Cats players
New Haven Ravens players
Rieleros de Aguascalientes players
Dominican Republic expatriate baseball players in Mexico
Sarasota Red Sox players
Syracuse SkyChiefs players
Trenton Thunder players